Liam Charles (born 28 August 1997) is a British baker, television presenter and contestant from Series 8 of The Great British Bake Off. He is currently a presenter on Bake Off: The Professionals and a judge on Junior Bake Off.

Education

Charles was a student at Goldsmiths University in London, where he studied Drama and Theatre Arts.

Career

Television
Charles first came to public attention as a contestant in The Great British Bake Off in 2017, being knocked out in the 8th week. He came fifth in the competition.

In 2018, he was chosen to co-present Bake Off: The Professionals with comedian Tom Allen. In November 2018, he also presented the baking programme Liam Bakes on Channel 4. In November 2019 Charles and Prue Leith were the new judges for Junior Bake Off after a two year absence. Harry Hill was the presenter.

In October 2022, Charles appeared in the second UK series of The Masked Dancer. He was revealed to be the character "Candlestick" in the sixth episode.

Writing
He has written two cookbooks, Cheeky Treats: 70 Brilliant Bakes and Cakes, which was released on 12 July 2018, and  Second Helpings released 19 September 2019.
He also writes a column on baking for The Guardian.

Platinum Pudding Competition 
In January 2022 it was announced that Charles would sit as a judge on The Platinum Pudding Competition, a nationwide baking competition launched throughout the United Kingdom on 10 January 2022 by Buckingham Palace, Fortnum & Mason and The Big Jubilee Lunch to find a brand new pudding dedicated to Queen Elizabeth II as part of the official Platinum Jubilee celebrations in 2022 marking the 70th anniversary of the accession of Queen Elizabeth II on 6 February 1952.

Filmography

References

1997 births
Living people
The Great British Bake Off contestants
Television personalities from London